Megachile chrysorrhoea is a species of bee in the family Megachilidae.

References

chrysorrhoea
Insects described in 1857